Funnsjøen is a lake in the municipality of Meråker in Trøndelag county, Norway. The  lake flows into the Funna river, a part of the Stjørdalselva river system. The lake has a hydropower dam at the southern end of the lake.

The lake Feren lies north of the lake and the lake Fjergen lies southeast of the lake.

See also
List of lakes in Norway

References

Lakes of Trøndelag
Meråker
Reservoirs in Norway